Tadashi Hattori is a Japanese ophthalmologist who is the recipient of Ramon Magsaysay Award. He is known for providing free of cost treatments in Vietnam. He has restored sight in more than 20,000 peoples. He has spent 20 years helping people see.

Personal life 
He was born in 1964. When he was 15 years old, his father died.

Career 
He graduated from Kyoto Prefectural University of Medicine in 1993. A Vietnamese doctor suggested he work in Vietnam. Then in April 2002, he went to Vietnam after resigning his job.

References 

Year of birth missing (living people)
Living people